Ajdar Ismayilov (full name: Ajdar Tağı oğlu İsmayılov; 23 April 1938 – 13 March 2022) was an Azerbaijani doctor of philological sciences, and one of the most active founders of New Azerbaijan Party.

Life 
Ismayilov finished Azerbaijan State University, the faculty of philology in 1961. He was a teacher, school director, worker of "Sherg gapisi" newspaper of Ministry of Internal Affairs from 1961 to 1977 and a teacher of literature in Nakhchivan State University, senior teacher as assistant professor and professor, in 1977–1994.

Ismayilov died on 13 March 2022, at the age of 83.

Scientific activity 
Ismayilov was the candidate of Literature Institute at Azerbaijan SSR Academy of Sciences named Nizami in 1969. He defended his candidacy dissertation "The historical dramas of Huseyn Javid" ("The Prophet", "Topal Teymur", "Seyavush", "Khayyam") under the leadership of academician Mammad Arif Dadashzade, the vice president of academy, in 1974.

He started to research a doctoral thesis the topic of "Huseyn Javid's creative work and demonism tradition in world literature" confirmed at The Scientific Council of Literature Institute named after Nizami, in 1982. In here, the Huseyn Javid romanticism source is told to be started from Zarvan (Avesta) philosophy, contrary to the thoughts that the formation of Azerbaijan romanticism is related to the affairs of 1905 to 1917. The poet's devotion to the creative ways of prominent figures was researched in the demonism context, especially the Turkish "Tenzimat literature" from the point of view of philosophy / aesthetics. The development issues and sequel of demonism traditions at world romanticism in H. Javid legacy were researched in the book. Ajdar Ismailov indicated the philosophical idea, mythological fiction roots of H.Javid creativity and he researched national and universal motives in poet's world.

Political activity 
Ismayilov played an active role in political life of Azerbaijan since the end of 1980. He was against the invasion policy of Kremlin, he supported Heydar Aliyev in his return to active politics and played a great role in establishment of the New Azerbaijan Party.

Works

Scientific monographs 
"Romanticism tradition in world and Huseyn Javid". Baki: Yazichi, 1982, 220 pages.
"Huseyn Javid tradition in Azerbaijan Soviet Literature" – methodical instruction. Baki. 1990. (It was printed by the order of 03.04.90 dated Azerbaijan)
"Huseyn Javid creativity and the demonism tradition in world literature". Baki. Elm, 1991. 224 pages.
"Ancient Fore Asia and Fore Caucasus Turkic tribes" (Armenians and Georgians in the land of Caucasian Oghuz Albania). Baki, "Nurlan", 2008. 799 pages. (First published in 2006) (It was printed by the decision of Scientific Council of History Institute of Azerbaijan Science Academy named after A.A. Bakikhanov).

Selected articles and interviews 
In front of the 250th birth anniversary of Molla Panah Vagif – Singer of beauty and love – "Sherg Gapisi", September 5, 1968. fourth page.
Some specialties of Javid theatre – Gobustan 1972 #4. Pages: 16-20
Some features of H. Javid's historical dramas – The 10th scientific meeting of council of Scientific Academy – thesis. Baki, 1973. Pages: 25-28
The people and hero problems – Ulduz magazine 1973, #5. Pages: 62-64
The free woman problem in H. Javid creativity – Azerbaijan magazine 1973, #7
H. Javid and Shakespeare (Iblis - Othello) – Science and Life magazine, 1976, #9. Pages: 22-24
H. Javid and Byron – Science and Life magazine
H. Javid and Goethe – Science and Life magazine, 1980, #1. Pages: 35-38
H. Javid and Shakespeare – Gobustan, 1981, #1. Pages: 15-17
Javid, Jabbarli and Azerbaijan Soviet Theatre – Newspaper of "Azerbaijani teacher", #65 (3159), 15.08.1979
Tracking a myth. Soviet Nakhchivan paper. 27.01.1980
Belief in sun in Azerbaijan – Soviet Nakhchivan paper #176 (12999) 26.07.1981
Spring holiday of our great ancestor – Soviet Nakhchivan paper #69, (14410) 18.03.1986
...It's the holy path we go on! – Sherur front – January 26, 1990, #4-5. P: 2
Where is our way – Sherg Gapisi #142 (15.682) – June 30, 1990. P: 3
Islamic fundamentalism: fictions, realities – Sherg Gapisi paper, #215 (15.755) – September 22, 1990. Pages: 2-3
Russian Empire troops at Sherur borders – Sherur fights frontal bulletin – Sherur print house, December 1990 #1
Today of old Sederek global situation – Azerbaijan magazine, 1991, #11
Open letter to secretary-in-chief of Azerbaijan National Centre in Turkey, Ahmad Garaja from Nakhchivan (1st part) – Ses (Voice) paper, #41 (70) 01.10.1992
Open letter to secretary-in-chief of Azerbaijan National Centre in Turkey, Ahmad Garaja from Nakhchivan (2nd part) – Ses (Voice) paper, #39 (68) 17.10.1992
The leader of our party is the people – Ses (Voice) paper 09.12.1992
The leader of our party is the people – Nakhchivan paper, #83 (267) 29.11.1997
The New Azerbaijan Party is the party of future – Yeni Azerbaycan Paper, #92 (267) 29.11.1997
I beg from almighty God – "For the victory" paper, #3-4 (3-4) 10.05.1999
XXI century must be the century of Azerbaijan language and Azerbaijan ideology in our national history – "Iki sahil" paper. 24.06.2001. (the interview was taken by Yegane Aliyeva)
The relation between "old Armenian statehood" illusion or "ishkil" (Outcast dog) ethnicity and "hay and armyan" meaning. "Iki sahil" paper. 31.10.2001
The relation between "old Armenian statehood" illusion or "ishkil" (Outcast dog) ethnicity and "hay and armyan" meaning. "Iki sahil" paper. 02.11.2001
The relation between "old Armenian statehood" illusion or "ishkil" (Outcast dog) ethnicity and "hay and armyan" meaning. "Iki sahil" paper. 03.11.2001
The relation between "old Armenian statehood" illusion or "ishkil" (Outcast dog) ethnicity and "hay and armyan" meaning. "Iki sahil" paper. 06.11.2001
The relation between "old Armenian statehood" illusion or "ishkil" (Outcast dog) ethnicity and "hay and armyan" meaning. "Iki sahil" paper. 07.11.2001
The closest friend and companion – "Free Azerbaijan", #62 (820) 27.04.2005 (The interview was taken by Haji Tofig Seyidov)
We need solidarity – national solidarity! 30.09.2006 (national solidarity interview)
The problems of 15-year-old NAP (YAP) – National Solidarity #9 (29). 21.09.2007. (The Ruhiyya Nasimigizi interview)
The historical realities about "The 26 Baku Commissars" or who are the 3 commissars without grave? – "Khalg" (People) paper-April 19, 2009. P: 4[9]
There are no notions of honor, dignity and pride in Armenian. National Solidarity #04 (47). 30.04.2009. (The Ruhiyya Nasimigizi interview).
Is it true to translate from Turkish to Turkish? (The National Solidarity paper interview) 31.01.2009

References

External links

 Əjdər İsmayılov - adam.az
 Əjdər İsmayılov Naxçıvan 1982 Hüseyn Cavidin nəşinin dəfni — YouTube
 Əjdər ismayılov pofessor,91 lərdən,24 aprel 1992 yaş senzi mitinq — YouTube

1938 births
2022 deaths
Academic staff of Nakhchivan State University
Baku State University alumni
Azerbaijani politicians
Soviet historians
20th-century Azerbaijani historians
New Azerbaijan Party politicians
Azerbaijani literary theorists
People from Sharur District
Recipients of the Tereggi Medal
21st-century Azerbaijani historians